John Paul "JP" Scearce (born December 19, 1997) is an American soccer player who plays as a midfielder for Union Omaha in USL League One.

Career

High school
J.P. Searce attended Chaparral High School in Scottsdale, Arizona

College & Amateur
Scearce began playing college soccer at Yavapai College in 2016, where he spent two seasons, making a total of 38 regular season appearances, scoring 13 goals and tallying 31 assists. For his junior season, Scearce transferred to Cornell University. In his two seasons with Big Red, Scearce made 30 appearances, scoring 10 goals and tallying 3 assists. He also earned second-team All-Northeast Region honors from United Soccer Coaches.

In his senior college season, Scearce played in the USL League Two with Lionsbridge FC in 2019.

Professional
On February 16, 2020, Scearce signed with USL League One side Union Omaha. He made his professional debut on August 1, 2020, appearing as an 84th-minute substitute in a 1–0 win over North Texas SC.

References

External links
 John Scearce – 2019–20 – Men's Soccer at Cornell

1997 births
American soccer players
Association football midfielders
Cornell Big Red men's soccer players
Lionsbridge FC players
Living people
People from Nogales, Arizona
Soccer players from Arizona
Union Omaha players
USL League One players
USL League Two players
Yavapai Roughriders men's soccer players